Annie Sweeney Reinhart (October 29, 1942 – August 24, 2004) was an American Republican politician from Liberty, Missouri, who served in the Missouri House of Representatives.

Born in Mobile, Alabama, she graduated from the Pine Bluff High School in Pine Bluff, Arkansas, and attended The Brown School of Business.  She worked as a pharmacy technician, a book and music buyer, an office manager, and as an executive secretary.

Electoral history

References

1942 births
2004 deaths
20th-century American women politicians
20th-century American politicians
21st-century American women politicians
Republican Party members of the Missouri House of Representatives
Women state legislators in Missouri
21st-century American politicians